Transylvania 6-5000 may refer to:

Transylvania 6-5000 (1963 film), an animated short film starring Bugs Bunny
Transylvania 6-5000 (1985 film), a comedy/horror movie